is a railway station on the Himi Line in the city of Himi in Toyama Prefecture, Japan, operated by West Japan Railway Company (JR West).

Lines

Station layout
Himi Station consists of a single ground-level dead-headed island platform, of which only one side is in operation. The station has a Midori no Madoguchi staffed ticket office.

Platforms

Adjacent stations

History
The station opened on 19 September 1912. With the privatization of Japanese National Railways (JNR) on 1 April 1987, the station came under the control of JR West.

Passenger statistics
In fiscal 2015, the station was used by an average of 843 passengers daily (boarding passengers only).

Surrounding area
National Route 415
Himi High School

See also
 List of railway stations in Japan

References

External links

  

Railway stations in Toyama Prefecture
Stations of West Japan Railway Company
Railway stations in Japan opened in 1912
Himi Line
Himi, Toyama